This is a list of notable events that took place in Pakistan in 1954.

Incumbents

Federal government
 Governor-General: Malik Ghulam Muhammad
 Prime Minister: Muhammad Ali Bogra 
 Chief Justice: Abdul Rashid (until 29 June), Muhammad Munir (starting 29 June)

Governors
 Governor of Northwest Frontier: Khwaja Shahabuddin (until 17 November); Qurban Ali Shah (starting 17 November)
 Governor of West Punjab: 
 until 24 June: Mian Aminuddin
 24 June-26 November: Habib Rahimtoola
 starting 26 November: Mushtaq Ahmed Gurmani 
 Governor of Sindh: Habib Ibrahim Rahimtoola (until 24 June); Iftikhar Hussain Khan Mamdot (starting 24 June)

Events

April
2 April – Pakistan forms an alliance with Turkey which, although not including military cooperation, opens the way to the Middle-East alliance due to its allowance of the entry of other nations.

May
19 May – Pakistan and the United States sign a Mutual Defense Assistance Agreement.

October
14 October – the Governor-General of Pakistan, Ghulam Mohammad declared a state of emergency, dissolved the Constituent Assembly and appointed a new Council of Ministers on the grounds that the existing one no longer represented the people of Pakistan.

Births
18 October – Aamer Hameed, cricketer.

See also
 1953 in Pakistan
 Other events of 1954
 1955 in Pakistan
 List of Pakistani films of 1954
 Timeline of Pakistani history

References

 
1954 in Asia